Mirasgar Mirabdulla oglu Seyidov (6 February 1970 – 14 June 1992) - National Hero of Azerbaijan was born on February 6, 1970, in the Qaraxanbəyli village of the Nakhchivan city of Nakhchivan Autonomous Republic of Azerbaijan.

Life
Mirasgar Seyidov worked in his own village after finishing secondary school in 1987. He returned to Nakhchivan after being dismissed from the Soviet Army in 1990.

In Battles
The First Nagorno-Karabakh War did not pass by Nakhchivan either. Armenian forces started attacking villages of Nakhchivan constantly. But all the attacks were prevented by the voluntary self-defense groups and Mirasgar Seyidov was one of them who voluntarily enlisted in the self-defense battalion of Yuxarı Buzqov village. He was fighting within this battalion. He showed extreme courage in all the battles. His last battle took place on the 14th of June, 1992. He was severely wounded and died while saving one of the wounded soldiers.

Family
He was single.

Awards
He was posthumously awarded the title of National Hero of Azerbaijan by decree 367 of the president of Azerbaijan Republic on the 18th of December, 1992.

School #15 in Nakhchivan city where he once studied was renamed after him.

He is buried in the Alley of Martyrs in Nakhchivan city.

References

External links
İTV kanalı. Milli Qəhrəman
Mirasgar M. Seyidov
Vüqar Əsgərov, "Azərbaycanın Milli Qəhrəmanları" (Yenidən işlənmiş II nəşr). Bakı: "Dərələyəz-M", 2010, səh. 258.

1970 births
1992 deaths
People from the Nakhchivan Autonomous Republic
Azerbaijani military personnel
Azerbaijani military personnel of the Nagorno-Karabakh War
Azerbaijani military personnel killed in action
National Heroes of Azerbaijan